Edwin Howland Blashfield (December 5, 1848October 12, 1936) was an American painter and muralist, most known for  painting the murals on the dome of the Library of Congress Main Reading Room in Washington, DC.

Biography 

Blashfield was born in Brooklyn in 1848 to William H. Blashfield and Eliza Dodd.

He studied painting at the Pennsylvania Academy of the Fine Arts after initial coursework in engineering at the Massachusetts Institute of Technology. He moved to Europe in 1867 to study with Léon Joseph Florentin Bonnat in Paris and remained abroad until 1881, traveling, painting, and exhibiting his work in salon shows. His academic background in painting and extensive travels in Italy to study fresco painting melded in work marked by delicacy and beauty of coloring. Following his early success as a genre painter, Blashfield became a widely admired muralist whose work ornamented the dome of the Manufacturers' and Liberal Arts building at the World's Columbian Exposition of 1893, in Chicago, several state capitols, and the central dome of the Library of Congress.

He was a member of numerous arts organizations, including the National Academy of Design, the National Society of Mural Painters in which he served as President from 1909 to 1914. American Academy of Arts and Letters, and the National Institute of Arts and Letters. Blashfield served from 1920 to 1926 as President of the National Academy of Design. Among his many honors, Blashfield was awarded a Gold Medal by the National Academy of Design in 1934, an honorary membership in the American Institute of Architects, and an honorary doctorate of fine arts by New York University in 1926. He served on the U.S. Commission of Fine Arts from 1912 to 1916. His circle of friends included sculptor Daniel Chester French, painters John Singer Sargent and Maxfield Parrish, and architect Cass Gilbert. His style was influenced by Pierre Puvis de Chavannes, Jean-Paul Laurens, and Paul Baudry. He married Evangeline Wilbour in 1881 and together they wrote Italian Cities (1900) and translated Vasari's Lives of the Painters (4 vols., 1897). Wilbour died in 1918 and Blashfield married Grace Hall in 1928. He became president of the Society of Mural Painters, and of the Society of American Artists. Blashfield died in 1936 at his summer home on Cape Cod and is interred at Woodlawn Cemetery in The Bronx, New York City.

Gallery

Selected commissions

in Atlanta, Georgia
 a mural of the Good Shepherd St. Luke's Episcopal Church
 in Chicago
a dome in the manufacturer's building at the 1893 World Columbian Exposition
the Elks National Veterans Memorial
 in Washington D.C.
 the dome of the Main Reading Room of the Thomas Jefferson Building of the Library of Congress
 the mosaic of Saint Matthew in St. Matthew's Cathedral
 the Iowa State Capitol at Des Moines, Iowa
 the Howard M. Metzenbaum U.S. Courthouse in Cleveland, Ohio
 the Minnesota State Capitol at St. Paul, Minnesota
 the Governor's office in Pierre, South Dakota
 the Wisconsin State Capitol at Madison, Wisconsin
 the Clarence M. Mitchell Jr. Courthouse in Baltimore
 the Mahoning County Court House, Youngstown, Ohio
 the Detroit Public Library
 in New York City
Appellate courthouse
the grand ballroom of the Waldorf-Astoria Hotel
the Lawyers' Club
the Great Hall of City College of New York, "The Graduate" mural,
the residences of WK Vanderbilt and Collis P. Huntington
the National Academy of Design, "Saint Michael".
 in Philadelphia
the residence of George W. Drexel (son of Anthony J. Drexel)
 the chancel dome of the Cathedral Church of the Savior
 the Massachusetts Institute of Technology in Cambridge, Massachusetts. Many paintings by the artist are present, including "North Wall Alma Mater", "South Wall Right Panel Humanity", "North Wall Left Panel Angels in Trees", et al., all painted 1923-1930.
 in Mercersburg Academy, Pennsylvania

References

Notes

 Cortissoz, Royal, introduction, The Works of Edwin Howland Blashfield, Charles Scribner's Sons, New York  1937
 The Works of Edwin Howland Blashfield", Art Inventories Catalog, Smithsonian American Art Museum, The Smithsonian Institution, Washington D.C.

Further reading
 Blashfield, Edwin, Mural Painting in America: The Scammon Lectures Delivered Before the Art Institute of Chicago, March 1912, New York : C. Scribner's sons, 1913.
 Vasari, Giorgio; Blashfield, Edwin, (editor) Lives of seventy of the most eminent painters, sculptors and architects, Volume 4, New York : C. Scribner's sons, 1902
 Weiner, Mina Rieur, (editor), Edwin Howland Blashfield: Master American Muralist, New York : W.W. Norton, 2009.

External links

Morseburg Galleries. The American Renaissance: Edwin Blashfield
 Iowa State Capital mural "Westward"
 The Papers of Edwin Howland Blashfield at the New York Historical Society
Letters from Edwin Blashfield

1848 births
1936 deaths
19th-century American painters
20th-century American painters
American muralists
American genre painters
American male painters
Members of the American Academy of Arts and Letters
National Academy of Design members
Orientalist painters
19th-century American male artists
20th-century American male artists